Astroblepus homodon is a species of catfish of the family Astroblepidae. It can be found in Colombia.

References

Bibliography 
 Eschmeyer, William N., ed. 1998. Catalog of Fishes. Special Publication of the Center for Biodiversity Research and Information, num. 1, vol. 1–3. California Academy of Sciences. San Francisco, California, United States. 2905. .

Astroblepus
Freshwater fish of Colombia
Catfish of South America
Magdalena River
Taxa named by Charles Tate Regan
Fish described in 1904